BookTok is a subcommunity on the app TikTok, focused on books and literature. Creators make videos reviewing, discussing, and joking about the books they read. These books range in genre, but many creators tend to focus on young adult fiction, young adult fantasy, and romance. The community is cited with impacting the publishing industry and book sales. The creators in this community are also known as BookTokers.

Background 
Videos posted by creators range in content, with a large majority focusing on book reviews, book recommendations, book hauls and bookcase setups. Some creators will concentrate on specific genres, BIPOC and LGBTQ authors, or even publicizing their own works through their posts, while others post tributes and recommendations for books published years prior. The Booktok creators are predominantly teenagers and young women, and predominantly focus on young adult fiction, young adult fantasy, and romance.

BookTok as a community was formed in 2020, after a video posted by TikTok user @caitsbooks gained popularity. This inspired more creators to begin posting and gain a following, including multiple accounts run by publishing companies. That summer, multiple viral BookTok videos led to even further growth in the community. This boost in the community led to an increase in popularity in BookTokers, and many of them now have hundreds of thousands of followers. By 2021, publishers began to reach out to popular creators to collaborate with them to promote specific titles or offer free books.

In December 2021, a BookTok community member sent out dozens of packages to other users which contained a newly published book and a coded message to create intrigue around the new book. The message was decoded within the month by a group of BookTokers called The Scooby Gang (@amivireads, @booksandbants, @caitsbooks, @ermreading, @frances.books, @sapphichobbit, @grapiedeltaco, @shanae0599, and @toriandbooks). Melissa Blair (@melissas.bookshelf), an Anishinaabei user, was revealed to be the author through a video posted by @sapphichobbit, and the book sold about 4,000 copies in the weeks prior. Other authors who post content using the BookTok tag, have noticed that books sell more, and they can stay connected or specifically target potential buyers through the hashtag and other specific ones that apply to their books.

Impact on sales and publishing 
TikTok videos of people recommending books led to a significant increase in sales. Several books found their way onto The New York Times Bestseller list due to BookTok videos. In some cases, the books that received this boost in sales were nearly a decade old, while other books gained popularity ahead of their release. Books can become popular on the app due to either a genuine love for them by the readers, or due to shock and jokes about the subject matter, as seen with the science fantasy romance novel Ice Planet Barbarians.

Both authors and publishers began to notice the increase in sales due to BookTok. Authors began to make their own BookTok accounts, while publishers made accounts for their company and sponsored popular BookTokers to promote their titles. Large publishers would also buy the rights to publish books by independent authors who gained popularity on the app. The Atlas Six by Olivie Blake was self-published via Kindle in 2020 and became a viral "BookTok sensation." The fantasy novel was acquired by Tor Books and re-published with revisions in 2021.

Bookstores such as Barnes and Noble have noticed BookTok's ability to drive sales, and have incorporated into their stores. Many Barnes and Noble stores have BookTok displays, featuring popular books on the app, and the company also has a section of their site dedicated to these books. Many retailers view BookTok as an organic marketing method, as readers find what is trending through the posts and want to read the books in order to engage with the community.

Some members of the community agree with the organic feel of marketing within the community, as it gives the readers more control over what books are popular. Others argue that it can create an echo chamber about which books should be read.

Popular BookTok books 
"BookTok Books" are the books discussed most frequently on the platform, and often have had a large increase in sales due to it.  These books include:
 The Song of Achilles by Madeline Miller
 Six of Crows by Leigh Bardugo
 They Both Die at the End by Adam Silvera
 These Violent Delights by Chloe Gong
 The Invisible Life of Addie LaRue by V. E. Schwab
 It Ends With Us by Colleen Hoover
 We Were Liars by E. Lockhart
 A Court of Thorns and Roses by Sarah J. Maas
 Ice Planet Barbarians by Ruby Dixon 
 The Seven Husbands of Evelyn Hugo  by Taylor Jenkins Reid
 My Year of Rest and Relaxation  by Ottessa Moshfegh
 The Atlas Six by Olivie Blake
 The Love Hypothesis by Ali Hazelwood

See also 
 BookTube

References

External links 
 #BookTok on TikTok

Book review websites
TikTok